Work Songs of the U.S.A. (or Work Songs of the U.S.A. Sung by Lead Belly) is an album by Lead Belly, recorded in 1942 and released a few months later by Asch Recordings.

At this point in Lead Belly's career he had split with John Lomax and was mainly recording with Moe Asch. In January 1942, Lead Belly recorded six tracks for Asch, all of which made it on to the album. Work Songs of the U.S.A. was released a three-disc collection of 78 rpm records in the spring of 1942. Although the sales of this album were disappointing (only resulting in 304 copies sold by March 1943), some of Lead Belly's best remembered songs debuted here, such as "Take This Hammer" and "Rock Island Line." A contemporary review in Jazz magazine was highly favorable, calling the record "superbly done."

Track listing

References 

1942 albums
Lead Belly albums